.dot may refer to:

DOT (graph description language)
Template (file format), for Microsoft Word